is a passenger railway station in located in the town of  Taiki, Watarai District, Mie Prefecture, Japan, operated by Central Japan Railway Company (JR Tōkai).

Lines

Station layout
The station consists of a single side platform for bi-directional traffic. There is no station building, but only a small rain shelter on the platform. The station is unattended.

Platforms

History 
Aso Station opened on 8 November 1928, as a station on the Japanese Government Railways (JGR) Kisei-East Line. The JGR became the Japan National Railways (JNR) after World War 2, and the line was renamed the Kisei Main Line on 15 July 1959. The station has been unattended since 21 December 1983. The station was absorbed into the JR Central network upon the privatization of the JNR on 1 April 1987.

Passenger statistics
In fiscal 2019, the station was used by an average of 38 passengers daily (boarding passengers only).

Surrounding area
Aso Onsen 
Ouchiyama River
Kumano Kodo Iseji
 Ryusho-ji

See also
List of railway stations in Japan

References

External links

 JR Central timetable 

Railway stations in Japan opened in 1928
Railway stations in Mie Prefecture
Taiki, Mie